ISDP may stand for:

Organizations
Institute for Security and Development Policy

International Society for Developmental Psychobiology

Information Technology
Industry Standard Discovery Protocol